Cameron Thorn (born April 16, 1990) is a Canadian football offensive lineman who is currently a free agent. He most recently played for the Calgary Stampeders of the Canadian Football League (CFL). He was selected in the seventh round and 58th overall by the BC Lions in the 2013 CFL Draft and signed with the team on May 27, 2013. He was released by the team on May 26, 2016, and signed with the Stampeders on June 8, 2016. He played CIS football with the Guelph Gryphons.

References

External links
BC Lions bio

1990 births
Living people
BC Lions players
Players of Canadian football from Ontario
Canadian football offensive linemen
Guelph Gryphons football players
Sportspeople from Simcoe County
Calgary Stampeders players